The reptiles of Great Britain include three native snakes and three native lizards. A number of sea turtles visit Great Britain's shores. There are also at least seven introduced reptile species.

Snakes (Serpentes)

Lizards (Lacertilia)

Sea turtles (Chelonioidea)

Introduced species

 Red-eared slider, Trachemys scripta elegans

 European pond terrapin, Emys orbicularis
 Common wall lizard, Podarcis muralis
 Western green lizard, Lacerta bilineata
 Aesculapian snake, Zamenis longissimus
 Grass snake, Natrix natrix

See also 

 Introduced species of the British Isles
 Lists of reptiles by region

References

Notes

External links
 British Reptiles from wildlifetrust.org.uk
 RAUK Identification Guide

 Wilkinson, J.W., Baker, J. and Foster, J. Priorities for Non-Native Amphibians and Reptiles in the UK. ARC Research Report 11/02.

Reptiles
Great Britain
Reptiles
Reptiles
Great Britain